Miguel Ángel Calero Rodríguez (14 April 1971 – 4 December 2012) was a Colombian professional footballer who played as a goalkeeper. He played 50 times for the Colombia national team between 1995 and 2007.

While playing in Colombia, Calero won two championships, one with Deportivo Cali (1996) and another one with Atlético Nacional (1998). In Mexico, he played 23 tournaments with Club Pachuca and won 10 cups with the team. At an international level, Calero won four CONCACAF Champions Leagues and the Copa Sudamericana in 2006; he also won the 2001 Copa América with Colombia's national team.

Career
Calero was born in Ginebra, Valle del Cauca, Colombia, but later became a Mexican citizen.

He played for Deportivo Cali winning the 1996 Copa Mustang Division Mayor: Primera A championship title and Atlético Nacional Colombia, then moving to C.F. Pachuca, Mexico, where he was captain of the team. With Pachuca, he won four national championships, three CONCACAF Champions Cups, one Copa Sudamericana and one SuperLiga title. He scored a goal against Chiapas on 11 August 2002.

He played for the Colombia national team and was a participant at the 1992 Summer Olympics and at the 1998 FIFA World Cup. In 2001 he was part of the Colombia team that won their first ever Copa América championship.

He was known for wearing a baseball cap as a goalkeeper and a bandana, and for having a pair of wings on the back of his jersey around his number, 1. These wings symbolize his nickname, "El Cóndor".

After a poor performance in Copa América 2007, which included a 5–0 loss to Paraguay, Calero announced his retirement from the Colombia national team.

On 23 October 2011, Calero played his last game with Pachuca and retired from football.

Health deterioration and death
Calero was hospitalized on 26 November 2012 after he suffered from a cerebral thrombosis at his home in Pachuca. After suffering from a second cerebral thrombosis episode, Calero was pronounced clinically brain dead on 3 December 2012. For the rest of the day, he remained on life support but the injuries were irreversible. At a public conference on noon of 4 December, Calero was declared dead. His funeral was held in Pachuca, Hidalgo, home of his tenured club CF Pachuca. After the ceremonies Calero was later cremated and his remains were divided with one half of it sent to his native Colombia, whereas the rest stayed in Mexico.

Honors
Deportivo Cali
 Categoría Primera A: 1996
Atletico Nacional
 Categoría Primera A: 1999

Pachuca
 Mexican Championship: Invierno 2001, Apertura 2003, Clausura 2006, Clausura 2007.
 CONCACAF Champions' Cup: 2002, 2007, 2008, 2010.
 Copa Nissan Sudamericana: 2006
 North American SuperLiga: 2007

Colombia
Copa América: 2001

References

External links

1971 births
2012 deaths
Colombian footballers
Association football goalkeepers
Colombia international footballers
Colombia under-20 international footballers
Deportivo Cali footballers
Atlético Nacional footballers
C.F. Pachuca players
Categoría Primera A players
Liga MX players
1998 FIFA World Cup players
1991 Copa América players
1995 Copa América players
1997 Copa América players
1999 Copa América players
2001 Copa América players
2007 Copa América players
2000 CONCACAF Gold Cup players
Footballers at the 1992 Summer Olympics
Olympic footballers of Colombia
Colombian expatriate footballers
Colombian expatriate sportspeople in Mexico
Expatriate footballers in Mexico
Colombian emigrants to Mexico
Naturalized citizens of Mexico
Copa América-winning players
Deaths from cerebral thrombosis
Neurological disease deaths in Mexico
Sportspeople from Valle del Cauca Department